Vittorio Gliubich (born Viktor Ljubić; 18 April 1902 – 1984) was an Italian rowing coxswain from Croatian descent who competed for Italy at the 1924 Summer Olympics. He was born in Zadar, then in Austria-Hungary. In 1924, he won the bronze medal as cox of the Italian boat in the men's eight competition.

References

External links
Vittorio Gliubich's profile at databaseOlympics
Vittorio Gliubich's profile at the Italian Olympic Committee

1902 births
1984 deaths
Sportspeople from Zadar
Coxswains (rowing)
Italian male rowers
Italian people of Croatian descent
Olympic bronze medalists for Italy
Olympic rowers of Italy
Rowers at the 1924 Summer Olympics
Olympic medalists in rowing
Medalists at the 1924 Summer Olympics
European Rowing Championships medalists